Nyctycia is a genus of moths of the family Noctuidae.

Species
 Nyctycia pectinata Draudt, 1950
 Nyctycia persimilis (Hampson, 1894)
 Nyctycia plagiogramma Hampson, 1906

References
Natural History Museum Lepidoptera genus database
Nyctycia at funet

Cuculliinae